Idaho Legislative District 25 is one of 35 districts of the Idaho Legislature. It is currently represented by Senator Jim Patrick, Republican of Twin Falls, Representative Laurie Lickley, Republican of Jerome, and Representative Clark Kauffman, Republican of Filer.

District profile (1984–1992) 
From 1984 to 1992, District 25 was a floterial district that contained Districts 22, 23, and 24. District 25 consisted of Blaine, Camas, Cassia, Gooding, Jerome, Lincoln, Minidoka, and Twin Falls Counties.

District profile (1992–2002) 
From 1992 to 2002, District 25 consisted of Cassia County and a portion of Minidoka and Twin Falls Counties.

District profile (2002–2012) 
From 2002 to 2012, District 25 consisted of Blaine, Camas, Gooding, and Lincoln Counties.

District profile (2012–2022) 
District 25 currently consists of Jerome County and a portion of Twin Falls County.

District profile (2022–) 
Beginning in December 2022, District 25 will consist of a portion Twin Falls County.

See also

 List of Idaho Senators
 List of Idaho State Representatives

References

External links
Idaho Legislative District Map (with members)
Idaho Legislature (official site)

25
Jerome County, Idaho
Twin Falls County, Idaho